Brickellia lewisii is a Mexican species of flowering plants in the family Asteraceae. It is native to Basaseachic Falls National Park in the state of Chihuahua in northern Mexico. The plant grows on hillsides and streambanks just above the waterfall at an elevation of about 2100 meters (7000 feet).

Brickellia lewisii is a perennial subshrub up to 30 cm (12 inches) tall with many small, nodding (hanging) flower heads.

The species is named for US botanist Paul Lewis.

References

lewisii
Flora of Chihuahua (state)
Plants described in 1997